Sellman is a surname. Notable people with the surname include:

Alfred Sellman (1880–1935), English footballer
Frank Sellman (1852–1907), American baseball player
Sher Sellman, American politician

See also
Selman (disambiguation)

English-language surnames